David E. Sanger (born July 5, 1960) is an American journalist who is the chief Washington correspondent for The New York Times. A 1982 graduate of Harvard College, Sanger has been writing for the Times for 30 years covering foreign policy, globalization, nuclear proliferation, and the presidency.

He has been a member of three teams that won the Pulitzer Prize, and has been awarded numerous honors for national security and foreign policy coverage. He is the author of three books: Confront and Conceal: Obama's Secret Wars and Surprising Use of American Power; The Inheritance: The World Obama Confronts and the Challenges to American Power, which was a best-seller; and The Perfect Weapon: War, Sabotage, and Fear in the Cyber Age.

Early life and education
Sanger is the son of Joan S. and Kenneth E. Sanger. His paternal grandfather was Elliott Sanger, a co-founder of WQXR-FM, the radio station of The New York Times; and his paternal grandmother was Eleanor Naumburg Sanger (grandniece of banker Elkan Naumburg), who served as program director of WQXR. He has one sister, Ellin Gail Sanger Agress.

He graduated from White Plains Senior High School in 1978. There, he was editor of The Orange, the student newspaper. He graduated magna cum laude in government from Harvard College.

In 1987, he married Sherill Ann Leonard, a law clerk, in a non-denominational ceremony in the Memorial Church of Harvard University.

Career

David E. Sanger is chief Washington correspondent for The New York Times and one of the newspaper's senior writers. In a 38-year career at the paper, he has reported from New York, Tokyo, and Washington, specializing in foreign policy, national security, and the politics of globalization. Soon after joining the Times in 1982, Sanger began specializing in the confluence of economic and foreign policy. Throughout the ‘80s and ‘90s, he wrote extensively about how issues of national wealth and competitiveness came to redefine the relationships between the United States and its major allies. He was correspondent and then bureau chief in Tokyo for six years, traveling widely in Asia. He wrote some of the first pieces describing North Korea’s a nuclear weapons program, the rise and fall of Japan as one of the world's economic powerhouses, and China’s emerging role.

Returning to Washington in 1994, he took up the position of Chief Washington Economic Correspondent, and covered a series of global economic upheavals, from Mexico to the Asian economic crisis. He was named a senior writer in March 1999, and White House correspondent later that year. He was named Chief Washington Correspondent in October 2006. In 1986 Sanger played a major role in the team that investigated the causes of the Space Shuttle Challenger disaster. The team revealed the design flaws and bureaucratic troubles that contributed to the disaster and won the 1987 Pulitzer Prize for national reporting. A decade later he was a member of another Pulitzer-winning team that wrote about the Clinton administration's struggles to control exports to China.

Sanger was awarded, in 2004, the Weintal Prize for diplomatic reporting for his coverage of the Iraq and Korea crises. He also won the Aldo Beckman prize for coverage of the presidency. In both 2003 and 2007, he was awarded the Merriman Smith Memorial Award for coverage of national security strategy. He also shared the American Society of Newspaper Editors' top award for deadline writing in 2004, for team coverage of the Columbia disaster. In 2007, The New York Times received the DuPont Award from the Columbia Journalism School for Nuclear Jihad: Can Terrorists Get the Bomb?, a documentary featuring him and colleague William J. Broad, and their investigation into the A.Q. Khan nuclear proliferation network. Their revelations in the Times about the network became a finalist for the Pulitzer Prize. In 2011, Sanger was part of another team that was a Pulitzer Prize finalist for International Reporting for their coverage of the Japanese tsunami and nuclear disaster. In 2012, Sanger broke the story that President Obama early in his presidency had secretly commissioned the Stuxnet cyberattacks on Iranian nuclear facilities; his reporting was depicted in the documentary film Zero Days (2016).

In a March 2016 interview Sanger questioned Donald J. Trump, who was running for the Republican nomination for President of the United States, about his views on foreign policy. Sanger pressed Trump on the idea that his worldview was one of 'America First', a term first used in association with Trump in a piece in USA Today by the former U.S. diplomat Armand Cucciniello. Trump "agreed with a suggestion that his ideas might be summed up as 'America First'." His campaign quickly adopted the slogan as the cornerstone of Trump's foreign policy. The phrase was used throughout the Trump administration.

Sanger is also an adjunct lecturer in public policy at Harvard Kennedy School, where he is the first National Security and Press fellow at the school's Belfer Center for Science and International Affairs.

Sanger is a member of the Council on Foreign Relations and the Aspen Strategy Group.

Books
Sanger has written two books on US foreign policy.  His first book is The New York Times best-seller The Inheritance: The World Obama Confronts and the Challenges to American Power (2009), based on his seven years as the Times White House correspondent, covering two wars, the confrontations with Iran, North Korea and other states that are described in Western media as "rogue" states, and America's efforts to deal with the rise of China.

Sanger's second book Confront and Conceal: Obama's Secret Wars and Surprising Use of American Power (2012) is an account of how Obama has dealt with those challenges, relying on innovative weapons (such as UAVs and cyberwarfare, such as Operation Olympic Games) and reconfigured tools of American power.

In 2016 General James Cartwright, then the retired Vice Chairman of the Joint Chiefs of Staff, pleaded guilty to making false statements in connection with the unauthorized disclosure of classified information, some of which appeared in one of the two books by David Sanger.

Sanger's 2018 book is The Perfect Weapon: War, Sabotage, and Fear in the Cyber Age.

References

External links

 Inside the White House: What Happened to the Bush Plan to Change the World?, October 25, 2007
 

1960 births
Living people
Harvard College alumni
The New York Times writers
American newspaper reporters and correspondents
Jewish American writers
Naumburg family
21st-century American Jews